Richmond Centre (formerly Richmond) is a federal electoral district in British Columbia, Canada, that has been represented in the House of Commons of Canada since 1988.

Geography
The electoral district comprises the western part of the City of Richmond.

Demographics

According to the Canada 2021 Census

Ethnic groups: 60.1% Chinese, 17.2% White, 6.1% Filipino, 4.9% South Asian, 1.8% Japanese, 1.3% Southeast Asian, 1.1% Latin American, 1% Korean, 1% Arab
Languages: 28.5% English, 25.4% Mandarin, 22.5% Yue, 3.2% Tagalog, 1.3% Min Nan, 1.1% Japanese, 1% Russian, 1% Punjabi
Religions: 56.3% No Religion, 30% Christian (12.5% Catholic, 1.2% Anglican, 1.1% Baptist, 1.1% United Church), 5.7% Buddhist, 3.3% Muslim, 1.6% Sikh, 1.3% Jewish, 1% Hindu
Median income: $32,800 (2020) 
Average income: $45,480 (2020)

Retail trade and the service sector (professional, scientific, technical services) are the major sources of employment in Richmond. 44% of residents over the age of 15 years have obtained a university certificate or degree. The average family income is over $112,200. Unemployment is around 10.8%. This riding is home to many Asian-themed malls and other businesses, such as River Rock Casino Resort, Aberdeen Centre, Parker Place, Lansdowne Centre, CF Richmond Centre, McArthurGlen Designer Outlet Vancouver Airport and is also home to the Vancouver International Airport.

History
The district was created in 1987 from parts of Richmond—South Delta. In 2003, more parts of Delta—South Richmond were added to it.

The 2012 electoral redistribution saw this riding renamed Richmond Centre and lost territory to Steveston—Richmond East for the 2015 election.

Members of Parliament

This riding has elected the following Members of Parliament:

Election results

Richmond Centre, 2015–present

Richmond, 1988–2015

Student Vote Results 
A student vote is when schools participate and hold mock elections alongside federal elections.

2021

2019

2015, Richmond Centre

2011, Richmond

See also
 List of Canadian federal electoral districts
 Past Canadian electoral districts

References

 Library of Parliament Riding Profile
 Expenditures – 2004
 Expenditures – 2000
 Expenditures – 1997

Notes

External links
 Website of the Parliament of Canada

British Columbia federal electoral districts
Federal electoral districts in Greater Vancouver and the Fraser Valley
Politics of Richmond, British Columbia